is a Japanese actor. Born in Kisarazu, Chiba near Tokyo, he attended Ichikawa Gakuen and later Nihon University.

Career
Takahashi made his debut with Nikkatsu and acted in youth-oriented films. Takahashi made film debut with Kōgenji directed by Buichi Saitō in 1961. In 1963, he starred in the yakuza film The Symbol of a Man  directed by Akinori Matsuo and won populality. Under exclusive contract with Nikkatsu, his notable films are Fighting Elegy and  Tattooed Life.

In 1971, Takahashi left Nikkatsu and became a freelance actor. In 1974, he starred Kenji Misumi's last film The Last Samurai. On television, he became a star in such jidaigeki television dramas as Kunitori Monogatari and Momotarō-zamurai. Modern roles are also in his repertoire. Among these is Detective Totsukawa in the Nishimura Kyōtarō Travel Mystery series. Takahashi is also active as a personality in quiz shows, exemplified by Quiz Nihonjin no Shitsumon (NHK, 1993–2003). He was a judge for Iron Chef.

Family 
His daughter is Maasa Takahashi, a professional presenter of Fuji Television.

Selected filmography

Film

Television

Commercial Films
He made commercials for Echigo Seika and Kansai Electric Power Company.

References

External links
 in Japanese
 

1944 births
Living people
People from Kisarazu
Japanese male film actors
Japanese male television actors
Actors from Chiba Prefecture
Nihon University alumni
Taiga drama lead actors
20th-century Japanese male actors
21st-century Japanese male actors